Zygia is a genus of flowering plants in the family Fabaceae. It belongs to the mimosoid clade of the subfamily Caesalpinioideae.

Selected species
 Zygia cataractae (Kunth) L.Rico
 Zygia claviflora (Spruce ex Benth.) Barneby & J.W.Grimes
 Zygia cognata (Schltdl.) Britton & Rose (Belize, Guatemala, Honduras)
 Zygia collina (Sandwith) Barneby & J.W.Grimes
 Zygia dinizii (Ducke) D.A.Neill et al.
 Zygia inaequalis (Humb. & Bonpl. ex Willd.) Pittier
 Zygia juruana (Harms) L.Rico
 Zygia latifolia (L.) Fawc. & Rendle
 Zygia lehmannii (Harms) Britton & Rose ex Britton & Killip (Colombia)
 Zygia oriunda (J.F.Macbr.) L.Rico (Peru)
 Zygia pithecolobioides (Kuntze) Barneby & J.W.Grimes – Granadillo de Río (Argentina, Paraguay)
 Zygia racemosa (Ducke) Barneby & J.W.Grimes
 Zygia selloi (Benth.) L.Rico
 Zygia steyermarkii (Schery) Barneby & J.W.Grimes (Ecuador)

Formerly placed here
 Albizia adianthifolia (Schumach.) W.Wight (as Z. fastigiata E.Mey.)
 Albizia petersiana (Bolle) Oliv. (as Z. petersiana Bolle)
 Albizia zygia (DC.) J. F. Macbr. (as Z. brownei Walp.)
 Ebenopsis ebano (Berland.) Barneby & J.W.Grimes (as Z. flexicaulis (Benth.) Sudw.)
 Havardia pallens (Benth.) Britton & Rose (as Z. brevifolia (Benth.) Sudw.)
 Pithecellobium unguis-cati (L.) Benth. (as Z. unguis-cati (L.) Sudw.)

References

 
Fabaceae genera
Taxonomy articles created by Polbot